Marlingford is a village and former civil parish,  west of Norwich, now in the parish of Marlingford and Colton, in the South Norfolk district, in the county of Norfolk, England. In 1931 the parish had a population of 181.

Features 
Marlingford has a church called St Mary, and a pub called The Marlingford Bell on Bawburgh Road.

History 
The name "Marlingford" is uncertain but may mean 'ford of Mearthel's people' or 'ford at Marthing'. Marlingford was recorded in the Domesday Book as Marthingheforda/Merlingeforda. On 25 March 1885 part of Easton parish was transferred to Marlingford. On 1 April 1935 the parish of Colton was merged with Marlingford. In 2001 the new parish was renamed to "Marlingford and Colton".

References

External links

 

Villages in Norfolk
Former civil parishes in Norfolk
South Norfolk